Michael "Mike" Joseph Sylvester (born December 10, 1951) is an American and Italian retired basketball player who is currently coach at Cincinnati Hills Christian Academy. Due to the United States boycotting the 1980 Summer Olympics, he was the only American to win a medal at those games, using a dual citizenship to play for Italy.

Biography
Sylvester was born December 10, 1951 in Cincinnati, Ohio. He graduated from Moeller High School with All-American honors and played college basketball at the University of Dayton. At , he was known as an accurate shooter. Sylvester's highlight with the Dayton Flyers happened at the 1974 NCAA championship, scoring 36 points in a game where the Flyers forced three overtimes and nearly upset Bill Walton's UCLA. Following that, Sylvester reported for both the NBA and ABA Drafts, being chosen only in the sixth round by the Detroit Pistons in the 1974 NBA draft, and the tenth by the Carolina Cougars in the ABA one. Afterwards, Cesare Rubini of Italian team Olimpia Milano invited him to play for the team in the 1974–75 FIBA Korać Cup. Rubini was ordered by Milano president to seek-out American basketball players of Italian descent who wished to become naturalized citizens and play for Italy. Sylvester qualified due to a grandfather being an Italian immigrant. Sylvester (known in Italy as "Silvester") would then sign with Milano, and right away be a major part of the team that won the 1975–76 FIBA European Cup Winners' Cup. Milano's victorious years with Sylvester would end in 1980, as after he had a heated argument with teammate C. J. Kupec, coach Dan Peterson would request for Sylvester to leave the team, and he would be traded to Pesaro for a then-Italian record $500,000. His Italian career also included stints with Basket Rimini and Virtus Bologna.

Sylvester was naturalized Italian in 1977. Three years later, he would be called for the Italy national basketball team, and had a great performance at the European qualifier that gave the Italians a spot at the Olympic tournament to be held in Moscow. However, as soon as Sylvester heard the United States was leading the 1980 Summer Olympics boycott, Sylvester wondered if he needed to adhere, particularly as an Italian player refusing an Olympic invitation could potentially banned from playing professionally. He contacted the U.S. State Department, who advised Sylvester to play. He still abstained from a vote within the Italian team about the boycott, saying he would follow the squad's decision – the Italians eventually played, though under the Olympic flag. Despite suffering a sprained ankle during the 1980 Summer Olympics, he won a silver medal after the Italians upset the Soviet Union before losing the Olympic final to Yugoslavia. Sylvester was the only American to win a medal at those games. In the following years, he would spend six seasons with Scavolini Pesaro, leading them to the 1985 Coppa Italia, two Italian League Runner-Up finishes (1981–82 & 1984–85), the 1983 Saporta Cup title, the 1986 Saporta Cup Finals and the 1984 Saporta Cup Semis.

Sylvester is a current resident of Loveland, Ohio. The Sylvester family has a sports tradition. Mike's brothers Steve and Vince were American football players, with the former reaching the NFL playing for the Oakland Raiders, and the latter being a college star at the University of Cincinnati. Mike's son Matt was also a basketball player, playing in college for Ohio State before going to Europe like his father.

References

External links
Dayton Flyers Profile
Archbishop Moeller High School Profile

1951 births
Living people
Basketball players at the 1980 Summer Olympics
Basketball players from Cincinnati
Basket Rimini Crabs players
Dayton Flyers men's basketball players
Carolina Cougars draft picks
Detroit Pistons draft picks
High school basketball coaches in the United States
Italian men's basketball players
Italian people of American descent
Olimpia Milano players
Olympic basketball players of Italy
Olympic medalists in basketball
Olympic silver medalists for Italy
People from Loveland, Ohio
Victoria Libertas Pallacanestro players
Virtus Bologna players
Medalists at the 1980 Summer Olympics
American men's basketball players
American people of Italian descent